The Ashtiname of Muhammad, also known as the Covenant or Testament (Testamentum) of Muhammad, is a document which is a charter or writ written by Ali and ratified by Muhammad granting protection and other privileges to the followers of Jesus, given to the Christian monks of Saint Catherine's Monastery. It is sealed with an imprint representing Muhammad's hand. 

Āshtīnāmeh is a Persian word meaning "Book of Peace", a Persian term for a treaty and covenant.

Document

English translation of the Ashtiname by Anton F. Haddad 

 For other translations of the Ashtiname, including the lists of witnesses, refer to The Covenants of the Prophet Muhammad with the Christians of the World (Angelico Press / Sophia Perennis, 2013) by Dr. John Andrew Morrow.

History
According to the monks' tradition, Muhammad frequented the monastery and had great relationships and discussions with the Sinai fathers.

Several certified historical copies are displayed in the library of St Catherine, some of which are witnessed by the judges of Islam to affirm historical authenticity. The monks claim that during the Ottoman conquest of Egypt in the Ottoman–Mamluk War (1516–17), the original document was seized from the monastery by Ottoman soldiers and taken to Sultan Selim I's palace in Istanbul for safekeeping. A copy was then made to compensate for its loss at the monastery. It also seems that the charter was renewed under the new rulers, as other documents in the archive suggest. Traditions about the tolerance shown towards the monastery were reported in governmental documents issued in Cairo and during the period of Ottoman rule (1517–1798), the Pasha of Egypt annually reaffirmed its protections.

In 1916, Na'um Shuqayr published the Arabic text of the Ashtiname in his Tarikh Sina al-qadim or History of Ancient Sinai. The Arabic text, along with its German translation, was published for a second time in 1918 in Bernhard Moritz's Beiträge zur Geschichte des Sinai-Klosters.

The Testamentum et pactiones inter Mohammedem et Christianae fidei cultores, which was published in Arabic and Latin by Gabriel Sionita in 1630 represents a covenant concluded between Muhammad and the Christians of the World. It is not a copy of the Ashtiname.

The origins of the Ashtiname has been the subject of a number of different traditions, best known through the accounts of European travellers who visited the monastery. These authors include the French knight Greffin Affagart (d. c. 1557), the French traveller Jean de Thévenot (d. 1667) and the English prelate Richard Peacocke, who included an English translation of the text.

Authenticity
The document is generally accepted as authentic by modern and ancient scholars, including Franciscus Quaresmius, Balthasar de Monconys, and Kara Mustafa Pasha.
Since the 19th century, several aspects of the Ashtiname, notably the list of witnesses, have been questioned by some scholars. There are similarities to other documents granted to other religious communities in the Near East. One example is Muhammad's alleged letter to the Christians of Najran, which first came to light in 878 in a monastery in Iraq and whose text is preserved in the Chronicle of Seert.

At the beginning of the 20th century, Bernhard Moritz, in his seminal work, concluded from his analysis of the document, that: "The impossibility of finding this document to be authentic is clearly evident. The date, style and content all prove the inauthenticity." Amidu Sanni points out that there are no existent codices, Islamic or otherwise, which predate the 16th century, and Dr Mubasher Hussain has questioned the authenticity of the document on the basis of the fact it contains an impression of a hand which it is claimed belongs to that of Muhammad, but which, rather than showing the inside of the hand as might be expected, "surprisingly shows the outer side of the hand, which is possible only if it is taken using a camera!" Furthermore, he claims that "many language expressions used in this covenant" are dissimilar "to those of the Prophetic expressions preserved in the authentic hadith collections."

Modern influence
Some have argued that the Ashtiname is a resource for building bridges between Muslims and Christians. For example, in 2009, in the pages of The Washington Post, Muqtedar Khan<ref
    name=khan09></ref> translated the document in full, arguing that

The Ashtiname is the inspiration for The Covenants Initiative which urges all Muslims to abide by the treaties and covenants that were concluded by Muhammad with the Christian communities of his time.

In 2018, the final legal judgement in the Pakistani Asia Bibi blasphemy case cited the covenant and said that one of Noreen's accusers violated the Ashtiname of Muhammad, a "covenant made by Muhammad with Christians in the seventh century but still valid today". In 2019, Imran Khan, Prime Minister of Pakistan, cited the covenant in a speech delivered at the World Government Summit.

See also 

Constitution of Medina
Marrakesh Declaration
Seal of Muhammad

References

Citations

Sources

Ratliff, Brandie. "The monastery of Saint Catherine at Mount Sinai and the Christian communities of the Caliphate." Sinaiticus. The bulletin of the Saint Catherine Foundation (2008) (archived).
Haddad, Anton F., trans. The Oath of the Prophet Mohammed to the Followers of the Nazarene. New York: Board of Counsel, 1902; H-Bahai: Lansing, MI: 2004.
Atiya, Aziz Suryal. "The Monastery of St. Catherine and the Mount Sinai Expedition." Proceedings of the American Philosophical Society 96.5 (1952). pp. 578–86.
Lafontaine-Dosogne, Jacqueline.  "Le Monastère du Sinaï: creuset de culture chrétiene (Xe-XIIIe siècle)." In East and West in the Crusader states. Context – Contacts – Confrontations. Acta of the congress held at Hernen Castle in May 1993, ed. Krijnie Ciggaar, Adelbert Davids, Herman Teule. Vol 1. Louvain: Peeters, 1996. pp. 103–129.

Further reading

Primary sources
Arabic Editions of the Achtiname
Morrow, John Andrew. The Covenants of the Prophet Muhammad with the Christians of the World. Kettering, OH: Angelico Press / Sophia Perennis, 2013. 
Amarah, Muhammad. al-Islam wa al-akhar. Maktabah al-Sharq al-Dawliyyah, 2002. 
Moritz, Bernhard. Beiträge zur Geschichte des Sinai-Klosters im Mittelalter nach arabischen Quellen. Berlin, Verlag der königl. Akademie Der Wissenschaften, 1918. (archive.org)
Shuqayr, Na‘um. Tarikh Sina al-qadim wa al-hadith was jughrafiyatuha, ma‘a khulasat tarikh Misr wa al-Sham wa al-‘Iraq wa Jazirat al-‘Arab wa ma kana baynaha min al-‘ala’iq al-tijariyyah wa al-harbiyyah wa ghayriha ‘an tariq Sina’ min awwal ‘ahd al-tarikh il al-yawm. [al-Qahirah]: n.p., 1916.

English, French, and German Translations of the Achtiname
Thévenot, Jean de. Relation d’un voyage fait au Levant. Paris, L. Billaine, 1665.
Pococke, Richard. 'Chapter XIV: The Patent of Mahomet, which he granted to the Monks of Mount Sinai; and to Christians in General.' Description of the East. Vol. 1. London, 1743. pp. 268–70. 
Arundale, Francis. Illustrations of Jerusalem and Mount Sinai. London: Henry Colburn, 1837.28–29
Davenport, John. An Apology for Mohammed and the Koran. London: J. Davy and Sons, 1869. 147–151.
Naufal, Naufal Effendi. [Translation from Turkish into Arabic completed prior to 1902].
Moritz, Bernhard. Beiträge zur Geschichte des Sinai-Klosters im Mittelalter nach arabischen Quellen. Berlin, Verlag der königl. Akademie Der Wissenschaften, 1918. (archive.org)
Affagart, Greffin. Relation de Terre Sainte, ed. J. Chavanon. Paris: V. Lecoffre, 1902. (archive.org) 
Haddad, Anton F., trans. The Oath of the Prophet Mohammed to the Followers of the Nazarene. New York: Board of Counsel, 1902; H-Bahai: Lansing, MI: 2004.
Skrobucha, Heinz. Sinai. London: Oxford University Press, 1966.58.
Hobbs, Joseph J. Mount Sinai. Austin: University of Austin Press, 1995. 158–61.
Morrow, John Andrew. The Covenants of the Prophet Muhammad with the Christians of the World. Tacoma, WA: Angelico Press / Sophia Perennis, 2013.

Secondary sources

 
Atiya, Aziz Suryal. "The Monastery of St. Catherine and the Mount Sinai Expedition." Proceedings of the American Philosophical Society 96.5 (1952). pp. 578–86.
 
Lafontaine-Dosogne, Jacqueline.  "Le Monastère du Sinaï: creuset de culture chrétiene (Xe-XIIIe siècle)." In East and West in the Crusader states. Context – Contacts – Confrontations. Acta of the congress held at Hernen Castle in May 1993, ed. Krijnie Ciggaar, Adelbert Davids, Herman Teule. Vol 1. Louvain: Peeters, 1996. pp. 103–129.
 
  
 
 
  A copy in the Simonopetra monastery, p. 546.
Ratliff, Brandie. "The monastery of Saint Catherine at Mount Sinai and the Christian communities of the Caliphate." Sinaiticus. The bulletin of the Saint Catherine Foundation (2008) (archived).

External links
A complete and accurate translation of the charter can be read here 
An English translation of part of the charter can be read here or here.
 Downloadable PDF of the 1630 Arabic and Latin edition at Google Books.
English translation at Islamic Voice. 
Ashtiname of Muhammad (Persian)
Ashtiname of Muhammad (Urdu)

7th-century Islam
Medieval documents
Medieval charters and cartularies
Treaties of Muhammad
Christianity and Islam
Saint Catherine's Monastery
7th-century documents
7th century in Egypt
Muhammad and other religions